Lourdes Ortiz Yparraguirre is a Filipina diplomat who presented her credentials to Secretary-General Ban Ki-moon on April 22, 2015 as Permanent Representative of the Philippines to the United Nations.

Yparraguirre also served as Ambassador to Austria with concurrent appointments to Croatia, Slovenia and Slovakia; Permanent Representative of the Philippines to the United Nations Office in Vienna, United Nations Industrial Development Organization (UNIDO), United Nations Office on Drugs and Crime (UNODC), Comprehensive Nuclear-Test-Ban Treaty Organization and the International Anti-Corruption Academy, as well as Resident Representative to the International Atomic Energy Agency (IAEA).

Yparraguirre earned a diploma in international economics and development from the Institute of Social Studies in The Hague, and a Bachelor of Arts degree in international studies from Maryknoll College in Quezon City, Philippines.

References

International Institute of Social Studies alumni
Filipino women ambassadors
Ambassadors of the Philippines to Austria
Permanent Representatives of the Philippines to the United Nations
Ambassadors of the Philippines to Croatia
Year of birth missing (living people)
Living people
Ambassadors of the Philippines to Slovakia
Ambassadors of the Philippines to Slovenia